Ballads of Living and Dying is Marissa Nadler's first studio album, released in 2004 on Eclipse Records.

Background
Nadler first began recording her songs onto cassette at an early age. When she turned 16, her parents gifted her a couple hours in a recording studio. When she entered art school in Providence, Rhode Island, she would perform at open mic events. This eventually led to her recording her first album: "I had a boyfriend at the time and he recorded that record for me over the course of many months and we fell in love during the recording, and he ended up being the subject matter for several albums after!"

Track listing
All songs written by Marissa Nadler, except where noted.
 "Fifty Five Falls" – 5:01
 "Hay Tantos Muertos" – 2:51 (Nadler, Pablo Neruda)
 "Stallions" – 3:11
 "Undertaker" – 2:17
 "Box of Cedar" – 4:39
 "Bird Song" – 3:07
 "Mayflower May" – 3:21
 "Days of Rum" – 4:20
 "Virginia" – 2:39
 "Annabelle Lee" – 5:15 (Nadler, Edgar Allan Poe)
 "Door Slam" (vinyl-only bonus track)

Personnel

Musicians 
 Marissa Nadler - Vocals, acoustic guitar, keyboards
 Myles Baer - Accordion, backing vocals, EBow, electric guitar
 Kendra Flowers - Harmony vocals ("Box of Cedar")

Production 
Recorded, mixed and produced by Myles Baer at Black Hole Sound Studios, 2003-2004.

References

External links
Official Site

2004 debut albums
Marissa Nadler albums